Benjamin Alan Taylor (born November 12, 1992) is an American professional baseball pitcher who is currently a free agent. He previously played in Major League Baseball (MLB) for the Boston Red Sox and the Cleveland Indians.

Career

Boston Red Sox
Taylor attended Brewbaker Technology Magnet High School in Montgomery, Alabama, graduating in 2011. He attended Chattahoochee Valley Community College for two years, and the University of South Alabama for the final two years of his college baseball career.  The Boston Red Sox selected Taylor in the seventh round of the 2015 Major League Baseball draft. He signed and made his professional debut with the Lowell Spinners of the Class A Short Season, and after compiling a 1.80 ERA in ten relief innings, he was promoted to the Greenville Drive of the Class A South Atlantic League in July where he was 0-2 with a 3.40 ERA in ten starts. In 2016, Taylor pitched for the Salem Red Sox of the Class A-Advanced Carolina League and the Portland Sea Dogs of the Class AA Eastern League, going a combined 1-2 with a 2.96 ERA in 36 games (three starts).

Taylor was on the Red Sox' Opening Day 25-man roster for the 2017 season. He was optioned to the Pawtucket Red Sox of the Class AAA International League on April 13, and he spent the remainder of the season between Pawtucket and Boston. In 12 games for Pawtucket he posted a 2.70 ERA, and in 14 games for Boston, he was 0-1 with a 5.19 ERA.

On May 17, 2017, Taylor recorded his first MLB save during a 5-4 extra inning win over the Cardinals.

Taylor was designated for assignment on February 18, 2018.

Cleveland Indians
On February 25, 2018, Taylor was claimed off waivers by the Cleveland Indians. He was designated for assignment on March 29, 2018. After clearing waivers, Taylor was outrighted to the Columbus Clippers on April 2, 2018.

The Indians purchased Taylor's contract and added him to their active roster on May 2, 2018.

The Indians designated Taylor for assignment on March 28, 2019 following the selection of Hanley Ramirez’s contract. Taylor was released on April 2.

Arizona Diamondbacks
On April 11, 2019, Taylor signed a minor league deal with the Arizona Diamondbacks. He elected free agency on November 7, 2019.

Chicago Cubs
On December 14, 2019, Taylor signed a minor league deal with the Chicago Cubs and was invited to major league Spring Training. Taylor was released by the Cubs organization on May 28, 2020.

Detroit Tigers
On February 19, 2021, Taylor signed a minor league contract with the Detroit Tigers organization. On March 30, 2021, Taylor was released by the Tigers.

References

External links

1992 births
Living people
Baseball players from Montgomery, Alabama
Major League Baseball pitchers
Boston Red Sox players
Cleveland Indians players
South Alabama Jaguars baseball players
Lowell Spinners players
Greenville Drive players
Salem Red Sox players
Portland Sea Dogs players
Pawtucket Red Sox players
Columbus Clippers players
Reno Aces players
Chattahoochee Valley Pirates baseball players